The 1966 Copa Libertadores de América was the seventh edition of the competition, the premier South American club football tournament, organized by CONMEBOL. Colombia and Brazil did not send their representatives. This edition became the first club competition of the world to include the runners-up of each of its participating association. Despite the fact that Colombian and Brazilian clubs did not participate, this tournament saw a record 95 matches being played out to determine this year's champion.

Colombia did not send a representative due to the disagreements between CONMEBOL and the Colombian football federations. The Brazilians protested the inclusion of the runners-up of each nation and argued that the tournament should be reserved for national champions. That led them to become denatured and the powers reserved only for the champions, in addition to the priority order they gave their interstate tournaments and the many unattractive encounters-to-come against teams from the "Pacific", the Brazilian clubs opted for tours around the world instead as they were seen more economically rewarding. Not having any economic incentives, CONMEBOL was forced to allow clubs the freedom of whether they participated or not. This trend will continue for the next 5 editions.

After winning each of their home legs, Peñarol and River Plate required a playoff to break the deadlock. The match was played in the Estadio Nacional of Santiago, Chile. River Plate finished the first half 2-0 and was in cruise control towards its first title. The manyas managed to revert the disadvantage to push this match into extra time. With two more goals, the final score of 2-4 meant that Peñarol became the first three-time winners of the competition. The collapse of River Plate in the second half led the club to being known, even now, as the "gallinas".

Qualified teams

Tie-breaking criteria
At each stage of the tournament teams receive 2 points for a win, 1 point for a draw, and no points for a loss. If two or more teams are equal on points, the following criteria will be applied to determine the ranking in the group stage:

a one-game playoff;
superior goal difference;
draw of lots.

First round
Sixteen teams were drawn into two groups of six and one group of four. In each group, teams played against each other home-and-away. The top two teams in each group advanced to the Semifinals. Independiente, the title holders, had a bye to the next round.

Group 1

Group 2

Group 3

Semifinals
Seven teams were drawn into two groups, one of four and the other of three. In each group, teams played against each other home-and-away. The top team in each group advanced to the Finals.

Group A

Group B

Finals

Champion

Top goalscorers

Footnotes

A.  The match finished 1-1, but Universitario were declared 0-1 winners as Alianza fielded two ineligible players: Catalá and Cruz.

External links
 RSSSF

1
Copa Libertadores seasons